The Great Britain national wheelchair rugby team represents Great Britain in international wheelchair rugby. Great Britain is the most successful team in European competition, winning six gold medals at the European Championship and a gold at the 2020 Paralympic Games. Since a national poll as part of The Last Leg, the team have been known as The Sweet Chariots.''''

Paralympics

Great Britain has competed in every wheelchair rugby tournament at the Paralympic Games, first when it was a demonstration sport in 1996, then since it entered the official program in 2000. Since Great Britain was the host of the 2012 Summer Paralympics in London, they qualified automatically for the wheelchair rugby event, as they were ranked on the IWRF Wheelchair Rugby World Ranking List

Roster
The squad selected for the 2020 Paralympics is as follows:

Competitive record

Paralympic Games

IWRF World championship

Past rosters

1996 Paralympic Games: Roy Humphreys, Alan Ash, Paul Jenkins, Jeffery Davey, Mark Eccleston, Rob Tarr, Darren Ransome, Keith Jones
2000 Paralympic Games: Simon Chambers, Troye Collins, Keith Jones, Graham Kamaly-Asl, Bob O'Shea, Ian Prescott, Darren Ransome, Paul Shaw, Mike Spence, Tony Stackhouse, Rob Tarr
2004 Paralympic Games: Andy Barrow, Jonathan Coggan, Troye Collins, Justin Frishberg, Ross Morrison, Bob O'Shea, Steve Palmer, Jason Roberts, Paul Shaw, Tony Stackhouse, Rob Tarr
2008 Paralympic Games: Alan Ash, Andy Barrow, Jonathan Coggan, Troye Collins, Justin Frishberg, Bulbul Hussain, Ross Morrison, Steven Palmer, Josie Pearson, Jason Roberts, Mandip Sehmi, Paul Shaw, Coach: Mark Edward O'Connor
2012 Paralympic Games: David Anthony, Andy Barrow, Steve Brown (captain), Jonathan Coggan, Kylie Grimes, Bulbul Hussain, Mike Kerr, Ross Morrison, Myles Pearson, Aaron Phipps, Mandip Sehmi, Coach: Tom O'Connor
2016 Paralympic Games: Alan Ash, Coral Batey, Ayaz Bhuta, Ryan Cowling, Jonathan Coggan, Bulbul Hussain, Mike Kerr, Jim Roberts, Chris Ryan, Mandip Sehmi, Jamie Stead, Gavin Walker, Coach: Paul Shaw
2020 Paralympic Games: Ayaz Bhuta, Jonathan Coggan, Ryan Cowling, Nicholas Cummins, Kylie Grimes, Aaron Phipps, Jim Roberts, Stuart Robinson, Chris Ryan, Jack Smith, Jamie Stead, Gavin Walker, Coach: Paul Shaw

References

A Laypersons Guide to Wheelchair Rugby Classification, International Wheelchair Rugby Federation (IWRF)

External links
Team GB at GBWR
From Murderball to medals in 2012? (video) at BBC London

National wheelchair rugby teams
Parasports in the United Kingdom